Parabacillus coloradus, the Colorado short-horn walkingstick, is a species of walkingstick in the family Heteronemiidae. It is found in North America.

References

Phasmatodea
Articles created by Qbugbot
Insects described in 1893